The men's team squash event was part of the squash programme and took place between 27 August and 1 September, at the Gelora Bung Karno Hall D.

Schedule
All times are Western Indonesia Time (UTC+07:00)

Results

Preliminary round

Pool A

Pool B

Knockout round

Semifinals

Gold medal match

References 
Jakarta Palembang 2018
Draw and Results

Squash at the 2018 Asian Games